The Central Australian Football League (CAFL) is an Australian rules football competition operating out of Alice Springs in the Northern Territory, Australia. Established in 1947, the CAFL is the oldest, most popular and important football league in Central Australia.

It is notable for producing VFL/AFL players such as Darryl White, Joel Bowden and Liam Jurrah.

The home of the CAFL is Traeger Park. The CAFL organises the annual Ngurratjuta Town Vs Country Challenge event and local Rec Footy competitions.

Current clubs
Pioneer
Rovers
Federal
West Alice Springs
South Alice Springs
Yuendumu
Ltyentye Apurte
MacDonnell Districts
Anmatjere
Hermannsburg

Premiers

List of premiers for the CAFL Premier division.

1947 Pioneer 
1948 Pioneer 
1949 Pioneer 
1950 Federal 
1951 Pioneer 
1952 Rovers 
1953 Pioneer 
1954 Rovers 
1955 Federal 
1956 Pioneer 
1957 Pioneer 
1958 Federal 
1959 Federal 
1960 Federal 
1961 Federal 
1962 Federal 
1963 Federal 
1964 Rovers 
1965 Pioneer 
1966 Pioneer 

1967 Pioneer 
1968 Pioneer 
1969 Pioneer 
1970 Rovers 
1971 Pioneer 
1972 Pioneer 
1973 Rovers 
1974 Federal 
1975 Pioneer 
1976 Pioneer 
1977 Pioneer 
1978 Rovers 
1979 West Alice Springs 
1980 West Alice Springs 
1981 Pioneer 
1982 West Alice Springs 
1983 Pioneer 
1984 South Alice Springs 
1985 Pioneer 
1986 Rovers 

1987 Pioneer 
1988 Rovers 
1989 Pioneer 
1990 Pioneer 
1991 Pioneer 
1992 South Alice Springs 
1993 South Alice Springs 
1994 Pioneer 
1995 South Alice Springs 
1996 Rovers 
1997 Pioneer 
1998 Pioneer 
1999 South Alice Springs 
2000 Pioneer 
2001 Pioneer 
2002 West Alice Springs 
2003 South Alice Springs 
2004 West Alice Springs 
2005 West Alice Springs 
2006 West Alice Springs 

2007 West Alice Springs 
2008 Yuendumu 
2009 Pioneer 
2010 Pioneer 
2011 Federal
2012 Rovers
2013 Federal
2014 South Alice Springs
2015 Federal
2016 Federal
2017 Rovers
2018 Rovers
2019 Rovers
2020 Rovers
2021 Rovers
2022 Pioneer

See also
AFL Northern Territory
Northern Territory Football League

References

External links
 

Australian rules football competitions in the Northern Territory